European Criminal Records Information System (ECRIS) is a database of criminal records, shared between members of the European Union, which started operation in April 2012.

See also
eu-LISA
 Schengen Information System (SIS II)

References

Government databases of the European Union
Policies of the European Union